Christopher David Smith (born 12 October 1990) is an English footballer who plays as a defender for Chasetown.

Playing career
Smith came up through the youth ranks at Everton before moving to Stoke City's youth system. Upon his release from Stoke City, Smith enrolled at the University of Staffordshire to study a degree in Sports Coaching and Development, sharing his studies with playing for Non-League side Stone Dominoes.

In June 2011, along with 5,000 hopefuls, Smith entered Samsung's Win A Pro Contract competition in a bid to earn a professional deal with Swindon Town. In February 2012, Smith was chosen by then Swindon manager Paolo Di Canio as the competition winner. Di Canio said of Smith, "he looked older than his age. As a right-back he has a fantastic quality. He's not very tall but when he challenges the opponent he has balance. Also, on the ball he is very good."

Smith made his League debut for Swindon in the 0–0 draw at Bradford City in May 2012. In November 2012, Smith joined Northampton Town on loan.

Following Swindon's decision to halve its wage bill over the summer of 2013, Smith was released by the club in May 2013, with Swindon manager Kevin MacDonald saying "the wage bill that was used this season was not sustainable so we have to reduce it. It's just a shame some good footballers have had to be released."

After leaving Swindon Smith returned to his native Stoke-on-Trent and signed for non-league Kidsgrove Athletic. He moved on to Chasetown in January 2014.

References

External links
 Profile at the official Swindon Town website
 

1990 births
Living people
Footballers from Stoke-on-Trent
English footballers
Welsh footballers
Wales youth international footballers
Wales under-21 international footballers
Association football defenders
Alsager Town F.C. players
Stone Dominoes F.C. players
Swindon Town F.C. players
Northampton Town F.C. players
Kidsgrove Athletic F.C. players
Chasetown F.C. players
English Football League players